Anton Westermann (18 June 1806, Leipzig – 24 November 1869, Leipzig) was a German classical philologist.

From 1825 to 1830, he studied philology at the University of Leipzig, where in 1833 he became an associate professor of classical philology. From 1834 to 1865, he was a full professor of Greek and Roman literature at Leipzig. On four separate occasions he was dean to the faculty of philosophy.

He is known for his edition and critical examination of Demosthenes, for his edition of works by ancient authors such as Plutarch, Lysias, Callistratus and Philostratus, and for his scholarly treatment of Greek mythography ("Mythographoi"), biography ("Biographoi") and paradoxography ("Paradoxographoi"). His edition of Heraclitus' epistles, Heracliti Epistolae quae feruntur (1857), later appeared in Rudolf Hercher's Epistolographi Graeci.

Published works 
 Quaestiones Demosthenicae,  4 volumes, Leipzig 1830–37.
 Plutarchi Vitae decem oratorum, Quedlinburg and Leipzig 1833.
 Geschichte der Beredtsamkeit in Griechenland und Rom, 2 volumes, Leipzig 1833-1835 – History of eloquence in Greece and Rome.
 Paradoxographoi, scriptores rerum mirabilium graeci, Braunschweig 1839.
 Stephani Byzantii Ethnikon quae supersunt, 1839; (edition of Stephanus of Byzantium).
 Diogenis Laertii De clarorum philosophorum : vitis, dogmatibus et apophthegmatibus libri decem, 1842; (part of series:  Bibliotheca scriptorum graecorum editore A. Firmin-Didot, with other authors).
 Mythographoi. Scriptores poeticae historiae Graeci, Braunschweig 1843.
 Biographoi. Vitarum scriptores Graeci minores, Braunschweig 1845.
 Philostratorum et Callistrati opera, 1849 (with other authors)
 Ausgewählte Reden des Demosthenes, 2 volumes, Leipzig 1850-1851 – Selected speeches of Demosthenes. 
 Die Modalität der Athenischen Gesetzgebung, geprüft an den in die Rede des Demosthenes gegen Timokrates §§ 20 - 23, 27, 33, 39, 40, 59 (Untersuchungen über die in die Attischen Redner eingelegten Urkunden, Tl. 1), Leipzig 1850 – The modality of Athenian legislation examined in the speech of Demosthenes against Timocrates. Investigations on proceedings in the Attic orators' documents.
 Lysiae Orationes : recognovit brevique adnotatione critica instruxit Carolus Hude, 1854.

References 

1806 births
1869 deaths
German classical philologists
Leipzig University alumni
Academic staff of Leipzig University